Calochortus amoenus is a species of flowering plant in the lily family which is commonly known as purple fairy-lantern.

Description
Calochortus amoenus is a perennial herb producing a branching stem to heights between 20 and 50 centimeters. The leaf at the base of the stem is narrow in shape, reaching up to 50 centimeters long and not withering away at flowering. There are two or three smaller leaves along the stem.

The inflorescence bears two or more nodding flowers, each with its petals curved closed into a spherical shape. Each flower has rose-colored sepals and petals, the petals fringed and lined with long, pink whiskery hairs. The fruit is a winged capsule 2 or 3 centimeters long containing dark brown seeds.

Distribution and habitat
The plant is endemic to California, in the Central Sierra Nevada foothills.

References

External links
 
 UC Photos gallery — Calochortus amoenus

amoenus
Endemic flora of California
Flora of the Sierra Nevada (United States)
Natural history of the California chaparral and woodlands